In number theory, functions of positive integers which respect products are important and are called completely multiplicative functions or totally multiplicative functions.  A weaker condition is also important, respecting only products of coprime numbers, and such functions are called multiplicative functions.  Outside of number theory, the term "multiplicative function" is often taken to be synonymous with "completely multiplicative function" as defined in this article.

Definition
A completely multiplicative function (or totally multiplicative function) is an arithmetic function (that is, a function whose domain is the natural numbers), such that f(1) = 1 and f(ab) = f(a)f(b) holds for all positive integers a and b.

Without the requirement that f(1) = 1, one could still have f(1) = 0, but then f(a) = 0 for all positive integers a, so this is not a very strong restriction.

The definition above can be rephrased using the language of algebra: A completely multiplicative function is a homomorphism from the monoid  (that is, the positive integers under multiplication) to some other monoid.

Examples
The easiest example of a completely multiplicative function is a monomial with leading coefficient 1:  For any particular positive integer n, define f(a) = an. Then f(bc) = (bc)n = bncn = f(b)f(c), and f(1) = 1n = 1.

The Liouville function is a non-trivial example of a completely multiplicative function as are Dirichlet characters, the Jacobi symbol and the Legendre symbol.

Properties
A completely multiplicative function is completely determined by its values at the prime numbers, a consequence of the fundamental theorem of arithmetic. Thus, if n is a product of powers of distinct primes, say n = pa qb ..., then f(n) = f(p)a f(q)b ...

While the Dirichlet convolution of two multiplicative functions is multiplicative, the Dirichlet convolution of two completely multiplicative functions need not be completely multiplicative.

There are a variety of statements about a function which are equivalent to it being completely multiplicative. For example, if a function f is multiplicative then it is completely multiplicative if and only if its Dirichlet inverse is  where  is the Möbius function.

Completely multiplicative functions also satisfy a distributive law. If f is completely multiplicative then

where * represents the Dirichlet product and   represents pointwise multiplication.  One consequence of this is that for any completely multiplicative function f one has

which can be deduced from the above by putting both , where  is the constant function.
Here  is the divisor function.

Proof of distributive property

Dirichlet series
The L-function of completely (or totally) multiplicative Dirichlet series  satisfies

which means that the sum all over the natural numbers is equal to the product all over the prime numbers.

See also

Arithmetic function
Dirichlet L-function
Dirichlet series
Multiplicative function

References

Multiplicative functions